= Mohammad Al Saleh =

Lebanese singer of Palestinian origin

- Born: Mohammad Fayez Ali; Sidon, Lebanon
- Occupations: Singer; songwriter
- Years active: 2017–present
- Musical career
- Genres: Pop
- Labels: Ajami Records
- Website: facebook.com/MohammadAlSaleh.Online

Mohammad Al Saleh (Arabic: محمد الصالح) is a Lebanese singer of Palestinian origin. In 2017 he released his first single, "Tayoubi".

== Discography ==
=== Singles ===
- Tayoubi (2017)
